Vincente Requena the Elder was a Spanish painter of the 16th century. He was born at Cocentaina. By 1590 he was practicing at Valencia. He painted the Immaculate Conception, and the Saints Jerome and Anne for the church of the monastery of San Miguel de los Reyes. He painted St. Michael for the convent of San Domingo.

References

16th-century births
Year of death missing
People from Cocentaina
Painters from the Valencian Community
16th-century Spanish painters
Spanish male painters
Spanish Renaissance painters